Neoascia tenur is a Palearctic species of hoverfly.

Description

External images
For terms see Morphology of Diptera
Wing length 3-5 ·25 mm. Tibiae 1 yellow with the dark ring. Metatarsae 1 yellow with the dark patch, other segments of tarsi 1 yellowish. Females: abdomen not as broad as N. meticulosa.
The male genitalia are figured by Barkemeyer & Claussen (1986)  
Larvae and puparia described and figured by Maibach and Goeldlin (1993) . 
See references for determination. 
 

The male genitalia are illustrated by Barkemeyer and  Claussen (1986)

Distribution
Palearctic Fennoscandia South to Iberia and the Mediterranean basin. Ireland east through Europe into Turkey and to European parts of Russia and on to Siberia.

Biology

Habitat: Wetlands, flushes and streams in blanket bog, raised bogs, fen, wet grassland, pond and lake margins and along brooks. Flowers visited include Caltha, Cicuta virosa, Filipendula ulmaria, Potentilla erecta, Ranunculus, Salix repens. 

The flight period is April to September. The larva is sub-aquatic within stem sheaths of  Typha and other water plants.

References

Diptera of Europe
Eristalinae
Insects described in 1780
Taxa named by Moses Harris